William Wace was an Irish clergyman and bishop for the Roman Catholic Diocese of Waterford. He was appointed bishop in 1223.

References

13th-century Roman Catholic bishops in Ireland
Bishops of Waterford